Lilac Hill is a cricket ground in Western Australia in the Perth suburb of Caversham, where the Swan River flows around its southern and eastern sides. The ends of the ground are known as the river end and the pavilion end.

In 1990 the West Australian Cricket Association (WACA) hosted a festival match at the ground, with a Cricket Australia's Chairman's XI playing the touring English XI. Since then, the WACA has continued to host an annual match at Lilac Hill against the visiting international cricket team and a Chairman's XI.  The inaugural 1990 match set an attendance record of 12,000 and subsequent years have attracted good crowds also.

Continuation of the match in Perth has been under pressure in recent years due to the full schedule of touring teams. In 2006, the format of the match was changed slightly to an "Invitational XI" v the Chairman's XI. In 2010 it was announced that the season opening match would no longer be held, due to increased constraints of international cricket scheduling.

Lilac Hill Festival cricket match results

Other matches

Perth Scorchers women's team
In recent times, Perth Scorchers women's cricket team have played two Women's Big Bash League (WBBL) matches on consecutive days, Saturday and Sunday, during the season. This is now known as the Lilac Hill Weekend.

The Scorchers first played at Lilac Hill in the second season of the WBBL versus Adelaide Strikers on Friday 13 January 2017. A match the Scorchers won. Over time it has become their secondary ground for home games after the WACA Ground.

For these matches at Lilac Hill, entry has been free with free rides and activities for kids. Fans are encouraged to bring their dogs down to the ground. This is with the goal to set a new record in dog attendance at a match. The Lilac Hill Festival Weekend received the highest fan experience score across the League in 2020.

Other uses
Lilac Hill is the home ground for the local 1st grade cricket teams, Midland-Guildford Cricket Club and Swan Athletic/Caversham Cricket Club and is also used for hockey and is the home ground of the Old Guildford Mundaring Hockey Club.

References
  Cricketarchive match results

External links 
 Lilac Hill Park No. 2 at ESPN Cricinfo
 Lilac Hill Park - City of Swan

Sports venues in Perth, Western Australia
Cricket grounds in Australia